1-Hexadecanethiol is a chemical compound from the group of thiols.

Synthesis
1-Hexadecanethiol can be obtained by reacting 1-bromohexadecane with thiourea.

Properties
1-Hexadecanethiol is a combustible colorless liquid with an unpleasant odor, which is practically insoluble in water.

Applications
1-Hexadecanethiol is used as a synthesis chemical. The compound is also used for the production of nanoparticles and hydrophobic self-assembling monolayers. The high affinity of the thiol group to the elements of the copper group causes the thiols to spontaneously deposit in a high-order layer when a corresponding metal of a 1-hexadecanethiol solution is exposed.

Toxicology and safety
The substance decomposes upon combustion with the formation of toxic gases, including sulfur oxides. It reacts violently with strong oxidizing agents, acids, reducing agents, and metals.

References

Alkanethiols
Foul-smelling chemicals